Izaak Aaronowicz, born Izaak ben Aron Prostitz (died 1629) was a Polish author and printer of Hebrew books.

He came from Prostic in Moravia, and moved to Krakow. In addition to many works of Hebrew, appreciated by Orientalists, is his edition of the Babylonian Talmud (1603–1605) in 12 volumes. Fluent in Hebrew and "learned in the Bible," he wrote several books on religious figures.

References

Polish male writers
Polish printers
1629 deaths
17th-century Polish Jews
Year of birth unknown
17th-century Polish businesspeople